Alexander Hugo Blankingship (1894 – July 21, 1975) was bishop of the Episcopal Church of Cuba from 1939 until his resignation on May 21, 1961. An alumnus of the University of Richmond and Yale Divinity School, he was a Commander of the Most Excellent Order of the British Empire.

References

External links 
Former Bishop of Cuba Dies

1894 births
1975 deaths
University of Richmond alumni
Yale Divinity School alumni
20th-century American Episcopalians
Episcopal bishops of Cuba
20th-century American clergy